Shankar Pillai is an American poker player from Commack, New York.

In 2019, Pillai bested a field of winners only in the $1,500 NL event. This gave Pilai his second WSOP bracelet. In the 2007 World Series of Poker, Pillai won a World Series of Poker bracelet in his first ever World Series of Poker event, the $3,000 No Limit Hold'em event.

As of 2019, his live tournament winnings exceeded $1 million. Off the felt, Shankar's interests include spending time with his family, sunset walks on Coney Island and eating hot dogs.

References

External links
 Hendon Mob tournament results

American poker players
World Series of Poker bracelet winners
Living people
People from Commack, New York
Year of birth missing (living people)